Cheshire Cat is the debut studio album by American rock band Blink-182 (then known as simply "Blink"), released on February 17, 1995, by Cargo Music. The trio, composed of guitarist Tom DeLonge, bassist Mark Hoppus, and drummer Scott Raynor, formed in 1992 and recorded three demos that impressed the San Diego–based Cargo label. In addition, their reputation as an irreverent local live act at venues such as SOMA alerted the label, who was seeking to expand into different genres.

Due to budget constraints the album was recorded quickly with producer Otis Barthoulameu at Westbeach Recorders in Los Angeles. Producer Steve Kravac engineered the recording and advised the trio to record additional overdubs. As such, the band spent an additional week re-recording several tracks at Santee, California's Doubletime Studios. The album was originally released with the band's name as Blink, until an Irish band of the same name threatened legal action, after which the band appended "-182" to the end of their name.

Released during the breakthrough year for punk rock in California, the album brought the band great success in and outside of the San Diego skate punk scene. "M+M's" and "Wasting Time" were released as singles to promote the album, and received popularity locally through radio play. The band toured in support of the album vigorously, most notably on the GoodTimes Tour in 1995, which brought them outside of California for the first time. Cheshire Cat is cited by bands and fans as an iconic release, and has sold over 250,000 copies as of 2001.

Background

San Diego-based trio Blink-182, formed in 1992, first promoted itself by recording low-fi demos to distribute to local record stores and at concerts. The three eventually were playing concerts at local venues such as SOMA, which alerted local independent record label Cargo Music. Cargo was at the heart of San Diego's music scene, which was not particularly thriving but still produced several skate punk acts.  Pat Secor, who funded the trio's demo Buddha and was the former boss of Hoppus, pulled for Blink's move to Cargo through a roommate who knew Cargo executives. Otis Barthoulameu, guitarist of local Cargo Music-signed act Fluf, saw potential in the young band and pushed them from the beginning. Eric Goodis, president of Cargo, wanted to diversify the label by incorporating different styles of music. His son, Brahm Goodis, thought Blink and their style of Southern California punk fit the bill and encouraged his father to listen to a tape. Together, Barthoulameu and Brahm Goodis convinced Eric Goodis to attend a live performance of the band.

Goodis invited the three musicians into his office and made the band an offer: he wanted to "start small" by releasing a 7-inch with the band. Blink were more interested in pursuing a full-length release; they had already saved money for a budget and made arrangements with a friend from a local band to record and release one on their own. Upon knowledge of this information, Goodis withdrew his original offer and signed the band on a trial basis. Hoppus was the only member to sign the contract, as DeLonge was at work at the time and Raynor was still a minor. DeLonge has said that Goodis did not favor the band, and invented the Grilled Cheese imprint of Cargo in order to keep them away from the main label. The Cheshire Cat sessions were to be the last performance with the band for Raynor, whose family had moved to Reno, Nevada. Raynor stayed with his sister for the summer of 1994 in order to rehearse for the recording of their debut album. The band rehearsed in DeLonge's garage, where they wrote "M+M's".

Recording and production

The deal was completed and Blink immediately set off to record their debut at the famous Westbeach Recorders in Los Angeles. DeLonge and Hoppus were excited, as  the "hallowed ground" had hosted their influences Bad Religion, NOFX, Face to Face, and Ten Foot Pole. Raynor recalled the sessions: "Westbeach was where all the Epitaph bands had been recording at this time. I spent the whole time thinking, 'Greg Graffin probably sat in this chair', 'Brett Gurewitz probably stood in this doorway,' etc." Fueled by "some great, terrible Chinese food," the band were forced to record and mix the sixteen tracks in three days, once again recording under serious time constraints. Despite the fact that the band were now in possession of a contract with the biggest indie label in San Diego, Cargo were still not in a position to offer more than a few days' worth of finances to record the trio's first efforts for their new home.

Unfamiliar with the area, the trio got lost on their first day of recording, arriving at the studio three hours late. Blink got to work immediately, setting up Raynor's drums and beginning to lay down tracks. "We were working ten- to twelve-hours straight, hardly even breaking for food or anything," recalled Hoppus in 2001. The band made reservations at local hotel not far from the studio for a room with two double beds. Despite the request, the band were stuck with one king-size bed, with the three musicians sleeping three-across in one bed. DeLonge recorded through Bad Religion guitarist Gurewitz's amp, and also accidentally broke his microphones. Producer Steve Kravac was the engineer for the album, and the trio made an immediate impression on him with their humor and eagerness. Kravac set the trio up and recorded most of Cheshire Cat live, and there were few retakes, which would lead to the record's raw appeal.

Kravac pleaded with a frustrated DeLonge and Hoppus (who was "try[ing] to make the best of it") to book more time for overdubs. According to Jeff Forrest, the band eventually decamped to more familiar surroundings of Doubletime Studios in Santee, California, where they recorded Buddha. The trio booked the studio for one week to allow time for additional recording. Still, recording progressed quickly at Doubletime according to Forrest, and the record was mixed as they went along. Forrest suggested a line ("In my town you can't drive naked") for "Wasting Time" while Hoppus was recording his vocals for the track. Despite the lost time and the pressure of limited resources, the recording went well. When completed, the quality of the recording was "near perfect" to the young band. As it was, Raynor moved to Reno and was replaced briefly with school friend Mike Krull. Hoppus and DeLonge wanted Raynor back, and Raynor moved back to San Diego to live with Hoppus and his family.

Packaging, title and composition

Artwork

The album's title and cover artwork originated from a calendar DeLonge had purchased. His day job in the first years of the band was hauling bags of concrete. While at work at an industrial park warehouse, a foreign salesman going door-to-door approached him with the calendar, which showcased photographs of cats. DeLonge found the calendars offbeat and showed Hoppus, who likened a photo of a Siamese cat with intensely colored eyes to the famous character from the Lewis Carroll novel Alice's Adventures in Wonderland. The band's request to use the photo was denied by the calendar company, however, the band employed Cargo's art department to computer enhance the photo until the band was safe from copyright infringement. DeLonge joked in 2020 that it was the "worst album cover ever".

Music
DeLonge, at the time of its release, called the album's musical style "not punk rock [...] We're nothing like the Sex Pistols, but our music kind of flowed from this genre of fast music with melody." The Los Angeles Times described the album's lyrical themes in a 1995 profile: "Most of blink-182's songs poke fun at their own youthful escapades, focusing on raging hormones, candy, masturbation, intestinal gas and other topics of interest to adolescents." The refusal to grow up, which arises in many later Blink-182 songs (most notably "What's My Age Again?") is a common lyrical theme on the record. The album's sound is inspired by punk groups the band idolized, such as the Vandals, the Descendents and NOFX. "Every song of ours is a version of another punk song that I've heard and tried to make better," DeLonge remarked at the time. "In the end, ours wind up a little different, but I know where the influence came from, and I think it's important to acknowledge that." A number of the tracks on Cheshire Cat are recycled from the band's previous demos.

"Carousel" is the record's first track, which also opened the Filter cassette demo Buddha. The song had its genesis in the very first jam session between Hoppus and DeLonge in 1992. It contains skate punk influences and has been described as "a satisfyingly fast-assed punk song in the vein of NOFX with some very adept dynamic breakdowns." The record's first single, "M+M's", follows, which is based around power chords and Hoppus' lead vocal of a vacation elsewhere. Track three, "Fentoozler" is another recycled song from Buddha. "Touchdown Boy" is written about being "the hero who always gets the girl." It is based around a school friend the trio knew and originally included his name, until the band thought better and toned it down. "Strings" follows, and "Peggy Sue" afterward, which is about "holding off from being aggressive when other people are telling you what to do."

"Sometimes" carries on the relationship theme, and "Does My Breath Smell?" has been described as "[DeLonge] singing some self-searching lyrics over a subdued riff" that later "[slams] into mosh-melting territory ... with one of the most economical lead guitar counterpoints to the layered vocals so far." The following track, "Cacophony" is slower paced and revolves around a relationship in which confusion reigns due to the imbalance of enthusiasm between both involved. Shooman writes that "the lyrics are unguarded and show a sensitive side of Blink that's quite often been somewhat obfuscated over the years by the popular perception of the band as goons goofing off." "TV" asserts that television is a vital part of life, and the recycled "Toast and Bananas" follows. "Wasting Time", which became the record's second and final single, is sung by Hoppus, longing for the object of his affection. "Romeo and Rebecca", likewise, argues that the object of his affection, and the fairer sex as a whole are a waste of time. Three more tracks close out Cheshire Cat, all of which are joke tracks, “Ben Wah Balls,” “Just About Done,” and, “Depends.”

Release and reception

Cheshire Cat was released through Cargo Music on February 17, 1995, on cassette. Initially, Goodis bet DeLonge the album would only sell 3,000 copies; by 2001, over 250,000 copies of the debut were sold. A CD release of the album occurred in 1995, and a vinyl version was released in small quantities in 1996. Along with the re-release of Buddha in November 1998, Cheshire Cat was re-released and received national distribution for the first time. Cheshire Cat has been called an iconic release by bands and fans. As an independent release, very few reviews were published upon initial release. Retrospective reviewer Stephen Thomas Erlewine of AllMusic gave the album three out of five stars and wrote that "the group is rather scattershot here, hitting the target as often as they miss it," noting that the release is better suited to more involved fans. Rolling Stone would rate the record at two and a half stars in 2001, describing it as "slapped together lilting melodies and racing beats in an attempt to connect emo and skate punk, a sort of pop hardcore." Website AbsolutePunk called Cheshire Cat a "good early indicator of what Blink-182 would turn out to be. Their sound wasn’t quite as polished, but they were certainly miles ahead of a lot of their peers at the time." At Fuse, it was list as one of the "strongest" pop-punk debut albums by Marie Sheyman, who added "they made the punk rock they loved even catchier".

Cheshire Cat was a strong seller for an independent band, despite the fact that popularity grew in the form of unauthorized CD copies across the country. The band were acquiring legions of new fans and radio play, and the buzz created by the album inspired manager Rick DeVoe to call Hoppus, wanting to manage the band. DeLonge threw together a crude "press kit" for DeVoe, which included photocopies of fanzines, reviews, and some cartoons drawn by DeLonge. The band members were ecstatic when DeVoe signed on with the band, as he promoted larger bands such as Pennywise, NOFX, and The Offspring. The attention also brought forth calls from Rick Bonde, of the Tahoe Agency, a booking agency based out of Lake Tahoe that worked with big punk and ska names such as Sublime. The husband-and-wife team of Rick and Jean Bonde, who owned and operated the company, began arranging shows for the band and minitours that gave Blink their first promotion outside of San Diego.

Mike Halloran, disc jockey at XETRA-FM (branded on-air as 91X), made "M+M's" a regular part of his radio show playlist, which Hoppus cites as the first person to play the band. When DeLonge first heard their song on the radio while driving in his car, he rolled down his window, "yelling at everyone to turn their damn radios on." The single was a local success and Cargo offered the band a small budget  ($10,000) to film a music video. Darren Doane, who had previously worked with MxPx and Pennywise, directed the clip. "We weren't planning on doing anything with that video except hoping it got on a surf video or something," said Hoppus. A Cargo Music employee presented the video to MTV, but network executives "threw the tape out" upon seeing guns in the film. Meanwhile, the record also drew the attention of an Irish techno band, also named Blink. Unwilling to engage in a legal battle, the band agreed to change their name. Cargo gave the band a week, but the trio put off the decision for more than two afterward. Eventually, Cargo called the band, demanding to "change the name or [we'll] change it for you," after which the band decided on a random number, 182.

The band also received their first profile in the Los Angeles Times in December 1995, which praised the album but questioned their authenticity and "punk" label. "I mean, is it the retro rock of England's Exploited, the anarchy of the Ramones or the political focus of Bad Religion? Punk has gone off in so many different directions that you can't really classify it anymore," DeLonge said. "People said Elvis Costello was punk when he first came out."

Touring and GoodTimes

The band expanded their fan-base outside of San Diego by embarking on their first national tour shortly after the release of Cheshire Cat. Alongside 7 Seconds and Unwritten Law, the band travelled in a small convoy of cars, being too young and broke to afford a van. Unwritten Law loaned the band their van, named "The Cock", for their first out-of-town gig in Reno, Nevada, and it broke before they were able to make it back. The band eventually purchased a Chevy Beauville tour van they christened "The Millennium Falcon". Through new manager Rick DeVoe's connections, the band broke through the surf/snowboarding scene by appearing on the surf video GoodTimes. The video was financed by Taylor Steele, friend of DeVoe, who wanted to put together a tour in support of the tape.

The GoodTimes Tour of October 1995, featuring the aforementioned bands and Sprung Monkey, introduced the trio to the south and east and was the band's first national tour. The trip was not without its incidents: DeLonge was arrested for underage drinking on Halloween 1995 in Jacksonville, Florida, and on another occasion, a small riot broke out between bouncers using excessive force and fans. The trio desperately wanted to continue on the second leg of the tour in Australia but lacked the funds; the members of Pennywise helped out and bought the band's plane tickets. Raynor recalled the tour fondly in 2010: "Honestly, the shows went well. We always got a good reaction, and the next time we came around we had more fans and better floors to sleep on — some with carpet!" Hoppus' sister, Anne, made T-shirts and described the tour: "Any money made goes back into the gas fund. You only have five dollars and it has to feed you all day. You eat nothing but crappy fast food, or on a good night, Denny's."

Early 1996 saw the three trekking to Alaska to perform and compete in a King of the Hill snowboarding contest. It was the site of an infamous prank fight between the members of the band and Pennywise that ended with local police being called and hotel security banning them. The band's first headlining tour took place afterward, and the following February dates — later dubbed the "Shitty Weather" tour — found the band performing through a harsh rain and snow. A seventeen-hour drive to Quebec City found DeLonge driving the entire way, unable to see through a snowstorm ("the biggest to hit the Northeast in forty years"). By March 1996, major labels began courting the band and the trio signed a joint-venture deal with MCA Records to distribute their sophomore effort, Dude Ranch, to be recorded that winter.

In all, the group toured the US three times and went to Alaska, Australia and Hawaii twice. "It's tiring," DeLonge told Thrasher in November 1996. "Then again, I just remember I used to work at this stupid job. I think about that, and I realize I'm not that bad off."

Track listing

Personnel

Blink-182
 Mark Hoppus – bass guitar, vocals
 Tom DeLonge – guitars, vocals
 Scott Raynor – drums, percussion

Artwork
 Jeff Motch – cover layout and design

Additional musicians
 Matt Houts – additional vocals on "Ben Wah Balls"

Production
 O – production
 Steve Kravac – mixing engineer, co-producer
 Jeff Forrest ("The King of Santee") – mixing engineer, additional lyrics on "Wasting Time"

Charts

Weekly charts

Certifications

Release history

Notes

References

External links

 Cheshire Cat at YouTube (streamed copy where licensed)

Blink-182 albums
Cargo Music albums
1995 debut albums